Piletocera rufulalis is a moth in the family Crambidae. It was described by George Hampson in 1907. It is found in Sierra Leone.

References

rufulalis
Endemic fauna of Sierra Leone
Moths of Africa
Moths described in 1907
Taxa named by George Hampson